Rud Ab is a city in Razavi Khorasan Province, Iran.

Rud Ab or Rood Ab or Rud-e Ab may refer to:
 Rud Ab-e Bala, Kerman Province
 Rud Ab-e Sofla, Kerman Province
 Rud Ab-e Vosta, Kerman Province
 Rud Ab-e Gharbi Rural District, in Kerman Province
 Rud Ab-e Sharqi Rural District, in Kerman Province
 Rud Ab District (disambiguation)